Åsa Svensson (born 11 February 1971) is a Swedish former table tennis player. She competed at the 1996 Summer Olympics and the 2000 Summer Olympics. She later became a coach for Halmstad BTK until June 2017.

References

External links
 

1971 births
Living people
Swedish female table tennis players
Olympic table tennis players of Sweden
Table tennis players at the 1996 Summer Olympics
Table tennis players at the 2000 Summer Olympics
Sportspeople from Halmstad
Sportspeople from Halland County
20th-century Swedish women